Bochman, Bøchman is a surname. Notable people with the surname include:

Dvora Bochman (born 1950), Israeli artist, painter, sculptor, graphic designer, and art educator
Lasse Bøchman (born 1983), Danish cyclist

See also
Bachman (surname)
Bochmann